Sukhobuzimskoye is a rural locality (a selo) and the administrative center of Sukhobuzimsky District of Krasnoyarsk Krai, Russia, located  from Krasnoyarsk. Population:

References

Rural localities in Krasnoyarsk Krai
Sukhobuzimsky District
Yeniseysk Governorate